Clement Adebamowo is a Nigerian medical researcher and academic. Born in Lagos, Nigeria, Adebamowo is currently Director For Global Health Cancer Research, and a professor of Epidemiology & Public Health, at the University of Maryland School of Medicine. He is known for his work in cancer epidemiology, nutrition epidemiology, and research ethics, particularly in low resource and under-served in Africa.

Education
Adebamowo graduated from the University of Jos, Nigeria, having earned BM ChB Hons and a distinction at every examination. He trained in Surgery and Oncology at University College, Ibadan, Nigeria, and studied epidemiology and biostatistics at Harvard University, where he earned a ScD.

Scientific work 
Adebamowo has published more than 80 scientific articles. His research interests are non-communicable disease epidemiology, cancer epidemiology, AIDS-associated malignancies, and Bioethics.

Adebamowo worked on community engagement and sample collection as part of the International HapMap Project, and, along with Charles Rotimi, is one of the principal investigators responsible for the HapMap and 1000 Genomes Project work with the "Yoruba in Ibadan, Nigeria" population.

Positions held
In addition to his role as professor of epidemiology & public health and director for global health cancer research at the University of Maryland, Baltimore, Adebamowo holds a number of journal editorships. He is editor in chief of Bioethics Online Journal (BeOnline), as well as of Cancer in Africa Online Journal (CIAO), and associate editor of Frontiers in Oncology.

He is also:
 President of the Society of Oncology and Cancer Research of Nigeria
 Director of the Center for Bioethics, Nigeria 
 Director of the West African Framework Program on Global Health
 Chair of the International Affairs Committee of the American Society of Clinical Oncology
 Country PI of Africa/Harvard School of Public Health Partnership for Cohort Research and Training
 Senior Research Fellow, International Prevention Research Institute
 Director of Office of Strategic Information, Research and Training, Institute of Human Virology, Nigeria
 Chairman of the National Health Research Ethics Committee of Nigeria

Awards and honors
Adebamowo holds a number of honors and memberships in societies:
 Fellow of the West African College of Surgeons
 Fellow of the American College of Surgeons
 Convener of the Nigerian Research Consortium
 Fellow of the American Society of Clinical Oncology (ASCO)
 Honorary Professor, University of Dundee, UK
 Member of the Expert Advisory Panel on Clinical Practice Guidelines and Research Methods and Ethics of the World Health Organization (WHO)

References

External links

 Dr. Clement Adebamowo's website
 Center for Bioethics and Research homepage
 Institute of Human Virology homepage

Living people
Cancer researchers
Nigerian oncologists
Nigerian scientists
Yoruba physicians
Yoruba scientists
People from Lagos
University of Jos alumni
University of Ibadan alumni
Harvard School of Public Health alumni
University of Maryland, Baltimore faculty
Year of birth missing (living people)
Residents of Lagos